Highland Avenue station is a station along the SEPTA Wilmington/Newark Line and Amtrak's Northeast Corridor, one of two stations in Chester, Pennsylvania, United States.  Amtrak trains do not stop there; it is only served by SEPTA.  The line offers southbound service to Wilmington and Newark, Delaware and northbound service to Philadelphia.  The station is located on Highland Avenue (US 13 Business) and 6th Street in Chester, PA.

Highland Avenue is a small station, less built up and less patronized than the larger station in Chester, Chester Transportation Center. The site of Subaru Park, the home venue of soccer team Philadelphia Union, however, is located nearby; however, since the club provides a complementary matchday shuttle from Chester Transportation Center, Highland Avenue remains little used.

In 2011, the Delaware Valley Regional Planning Commission studied whether to close Highland Avenue and to replace it with a new station at Engle Street, placing it closer to Subaru Park.

Station layout
Highland Avenue has two low-level wooden side platforms with walkways connecting passengers to the inner tracks. Amtrak's Northeast Corridor lines bypass the station via the inner tracks.

References

External links
 SEPTA – Highland Avenue Station
 Highland Avenue entrance from Google Maps Street View

SEPTA Regional Rail stations
Stations on the Northeast Corridor
Railway stations in Delaware County, Pennsylvania
Chester, Pennsylvania
Wilmington/Newark Line